Milan Vignjević (born 30 March 1989) is a Serbian football midfielder playing with Dinamo Vranje.

Club career
Born in Zagreb, SR Croatia, he played with FK Radnički Obrenovac, FK Šumadija Jagnjilo and Sopot until summer 2009 when he joined Serbian SuperLiga side FK Rad.  During the winter break of the 2009–10 season, he moved to the newly promoted FK BSK Borča where he played in the following two and a half seasons. In summer 2012 he moved to FK Napredak Kruševac.

References

External links
 http://www.sportske.net/vest/domaci-fudbal/prosinecki-juri-vignjevica-75033.html
 http://www.sportklub.rs/moreira-odlazi-dolazi-vignjevic
 https://archive.today/20140205030136/http://www.sport24.ba/index.php/fudbal/transferi/item/8479-milan-vignjevic-karijeru-nastavlja-na-malti
 http://www.avaz.ba/sport/fudbal/vignjevic-karijeru-nastavlja-u-portugalu
 http://www.sportske.net/vest/transferi/vignjevic-blizu-portugala-170764.html

Video
 http://www.dailymotion.com/video/x1bhkml_milan-vignjevic_sport
 https://www.youtube.com/watch?v=rUms8bk0yww
 https://www.youtube.com/watch?v=e9NICHo1DnQ
 https://www.youtube.com/watch?v=bKIklxgxt5g

1989 births
Living people
Footballers from Zagreb
Serbs of Croatia
Serbian footballers
Association football midfielders
FK Radnički Obrenovac players
FK Rad players
FK BSK Borča players
FK Napredak Kruševac players
FK Metalac Gornji Milanovac players
FK Radnik Bijeljina players
FK Dinamo Vranje players
Serbian SuperLiga players
Serbian expatriate footballers
Serbian expatriate sportspeople in Malta
Expatriate footballers in Malta
Naxxar Lions F.C. players
Maltese Premier League players